Johnston Cornish (June 13, 1858 – June 26, 1920) was an American Democratic Party politician who represented  in the U.S. representative for one term from 1893 to 1895.

Early life and career
Born in Bethlehem Township, New Jersey, Cornish attended the common schools. He moved with his parents to Washington, New Jersey, in 1870. He was graduated from the Easton (Pennsylvania) Business College, and engaged in the manufacture of pianos and organs.

Political career
Cornish was elected Mayor of Washington, New Jersey, in 1884, and reelected in 1885 and 1886. He declined renomination in 1887 and in 1888. He served as member of the New Jersey Senate from 1891 to 1893, representing Warren County.

Congress
Cornish was elected as a Democrat to the Fifty-third Congress, serving in office from March 4, 1893 to March 3, 1895. He was an unsuccessful candidate for reelection in 1894 and lost again in 1896. He accompanied William Jennings Bryan on his whistle stop tour through New Jersey, pausing in Washington on September 23, 1896.

Later career and death
After leaving Congress, Cornish again served as a member of the New Jersey Senate from Warren County from 1900 to 1902 and 1906 to 1911.

He served as president of Cornish Piano in 1910. He served as member of the New Jersey Democratic State Committee. He served as president of the First National Bank, Washington Water, and the Warren County Bankers' Association at the time of his death in Washington, New Jersey on June 26, 1920. He was interred in the Cornish family plot in Washington Cemetery.

References

External links

Johnston Cornish at The Political Graveyard

1858 births
1920 deaths
Mayors of places in New Jersey
Democratic Party New Jersey state senators
People from Bethlehem Township, New Jersey
Democratic Party members of the United States House of Representatives from New Jersey
People from Washington, New Jersey
Politicians from Warren County, New Jersey
Burials in New Jersey